Greatest Hits is a greatest hits album by American rapper Pitbull. It was released on December 1, 2017, by RCA Records. The compilation consists of songs released between 2009 and 2014. In June 2022, the album peaked at number 108 on the US Billboard 200.  The album contains eleven previously released singles and two new songs, "Jungle" and "Locas".

Critical reception
In a review for AllMusic, Neil Yeung wrote: "Kicking off with his two highest-charting singles to date, Greatest Hits is a not-so-subtle reminder of just how deft Pitbull is at creating catchy, upbeat, and celebratory anthems."

Billboard's Tatiana Cirisano listed the album cover as one of the worst of 2017, calling it "a bit over-the-top".

Commercial performance
On the Billboard 200 chart dated for the week of March 18, 2023, Greatest Hits reached the milestone of spending 100 weeks on the chart. This became the first album by Pitbull to accomplish the rare feat.

Track listing

Charts

Weekly charts

Year-end charts

Certifications

References

2017 greatest hits albums
Pitbull (rapper) albums